The Man from Tumbleweeds is a 1940 American Western film directed by Joseph H. Lewis and written by Charles F. Royal. The film stars Wild Bill Elliott, Iris Meredith, Dub Taylor, Ray Bennett, Francis Walker and Ernie Adams. The film was released on May 2, 1940, by Columbia Pictures.

Plot

Cast           
Wild Bill Elliott as Wild Bill Saunders
Iris Meredith as 'Spunky' Cameron
Dub Taylor as Cannonball
Ray Bennett as Powder Kilgore 
Francis Walker as Lightning Barlow
Ernie Adams as Shifty Sheldon
Al Hill as Honest John Webster
Stanley Brown as Ranger Dixon
Richard Fiske as Henchman Slash
Edward LeSaint as Jeff Cameron
Don Beddoe as Governor Dawson

References

External links
 

1940 films
1940s English-language films
American Western (genre) films
1940 Western (genre) films
Columbia Pictures films
Films directed by Joseph H. Lewis
American black-and-white films
1940s American films